Silva Bendrāte (born February 29, 1956) is a Latvian radio journalist and politician, who served as deputy to the Saeima from 2014 to 2018.

References 

1956 births
Living people
People from Kuldīga
New Era Party politicians
New Unity politicians
Deputies of the 8th Saeima
Deputies of the 9th Saeima
Deputies of the 10th Saeima
University of Latvia alumni
21st-century Latvian women politicians
Women deputies of the Saeima